Jake Barker-Daish (born 7 May 1993) is an Australian football (soccer) player who plays as a midfielder for Moreland Zebras. He previously played for Adelaide United in the A-League. In the 2010–11 season Barker-Daish won the Australian Institute of Sport Player of the Year.

Club career

Youth career
Barker-Daish was selected for the Australian Institute of Sport at just 15 years of age.

Gold Coast United
In 2011 Barker-Daish signed with A-League club Gold Coast United. He made his professional debut in the 2011–12 A-League season on 17 February 2012, in a round 21 clash against Melbourne Heart. He made seven appearances for Gold Coast United, where he managed to gain 3 assists in his first two starts.

Adelaide United
On 6 April 2012, it was announced that Barker-Daish had signed for Adelaide United in the A-League. He would feature in 19 appearances over two injury-interrupted seasons for the Reds, scoring two goals in his time there.

Colne
After being released from Adelaide United, Barker-Daish signed a short-term contract with North West Counties Football League side Colne F.C. He made two league appearances and made two appearances in the Men United Cup winning the man of the match award in a match against Silsden F.C., a match in which he also scored the winning goal.

NPL Victoria
In February 2015, Barker-Daish signed for South Melbourne in the NPL.

He then joined newly promoted Richmond SC in February 2016. Despite scoring nine goals for the club and winning the club's Most Valuable Player award, they were unable to escape relegation, losing 4–0 to North Geelong Warriors in the promotion-relegation playoff.

Barker-Daish joined Melbourne Knights for the 2017 season. Due to a serious hip injury his season was cut short and was unable to continue to play for the club after round 3 of the 2017 season.

International career 
Barker-Daish has represented his country at the 2011 FIFA U-20 World Cup in Colombia.

References 

1993 births
Living people
Australian soccer players
Australian expatriate sportspeople in England
Association football midfielders
Australian Institute of Sport soccer players
Altona Magic SC players
Gold Coast United FC players
Adelaide United FC players
Colne F.C. players
South Melbourne FC players
Richmond SC players
Melbourne Knights FC players
Moreland Zebras FC players
A-League Men players
National Premier Leagues players
Soccer players from Melbourne
Victorian Institute of Sport alumni
Australian expatriate soccer players
Expatriate footballers in England
Australia under-23 international soccer players
Australia under-20 international soccer players